EHC Norad (also known as EHC Hoensbroek Norad or simply EHC) is a Dutch Football Club based in Hoensbroek, Netherlands. The club was founded on 27 September 1917. Its first squad currently plays in the Hoofdklasse.

References

External links
 EHC Hoensbroek Norad Club Website (Dutch)
 EHC Norad In National Football Teams
 EHC Norad History, Football-Lineups.com

Football clubs in the Netherlands
Association football clubs established in 1917
1917 establishments in the Netherlands
Football clubs in Heerlen